King Maker (Cantonese Yale: jou wong je) is a Hong Kong historical-fiction television drama serial produced by TVB under executive producer Leung Choi-yuen. King Maker started its broadcast on Hong Kong's Jade and HD Jade channels on 13 August 2012.

Plot
Song dynasty's first prince Kwai Sing (Pierre Ngo) and second prince Kwai Wo (Lai Lok-yi) greedily compete for the throne. Yu Jing (Wayne Lai) and Tung Chiu (Kent Cheng) are responsible in advising each prince. Jing and Chiu are old family friends, having a mentor-friend relationship.

Jing's father Yu Pok Man (KK Cheung) brought trouble to the family when his achievements made his advisor feel uneasy. Since then, Jing was separated from his younger brother Yu Tsing (Patrick Tang) and sister Yu Ching (Natalie Tong). Tsing was deceived into becoming an imperial eunuch, while Ching loses her memory, but fortunately triad leader Fan Chiu Lun (Shek Sau) adopts her and triad member Yim Sam Leung (Kristal Tin) takes care of her.

Big villain Yeung Chi San (Joseph Lee) and his sister Consort Wai cause much trouble to get Kwai Wo the throne instead. But, perhaps San and Wai are not the only villains, and there are many others that are much more evil...

Cast and characters

Royal court

Yu Family

Tung Family

Fan Family

Yeung Family

Production

Development
The drama began in development in early 2011, and announced their intentions to cast Kent Cheng and Wayne Lai, who had previously worked together in Leung Choi-yuen's The Greatness of a Hero in 2008. In June 2011, TVB announced their casting of Cheng and Lai, in which Cheng was willing to reject two other high-paying productions for an opportunity to work with Lai again.

Principal photography began mid-August 2011, following the press conference and costume fitting that was held on 16 August. A blessing ceremony was later held on 21 September 2011.

Viewership ratings
The following is a table that includes a list of the total ratings points based on television viewership.

International Broadcast
  - 8TV (Malaysia)

References

External links
Official TVB  website
K-TVB.net

TVB dramas
Television series set in the Southern Song
2012 Hong Kong television series debuts
2012 Hong Kong television series endings